Lewis Lake, Nova Scotia could mean the following:

Community
Lewis Lake Unincorporated area in the Halifax Regional Municipality  
Lewis Lake Unincorporated area in the Halifax Regional Municipality

Lakes
Lewis Lake, a lake in Guysborough County at 
Lewis Lake, a lake in Hants County at 
Lewis Lake, a lake in the Municipality of the District of Chester at 

In the Halifax Regional Municipality there are 5 lakes named Lewis Lake:
Lewis Lake near Moose River Gold Mines 
Lewis Lake near Lake Echo 
Lewis Lake in Upper Hammonds Plains 
Lewis Lake in Hubley 
Lewis Lake at Upper Sackville

Park
Lewis Lake Provincial Park

See also
Lewis Lake (disambiguation)

References
Geographical Names Board of Canada
Explore HRM
Nova Scotia Placenames

Lakes of Nova Scotia
General Service Areas in Nova Scotia